George Purnell Fisher (October 13, 1817 – February 10, 1899) was Attorney General of Delaware, Secretary of State of Delaware, a United States representative from Delaware and an Associate Justice of the Supreme Court of the District of Columbia, now the United States District Court for the District of Columbia.

Education and career

Born on October 13, 1817, in Milford, Sussex County, Delaware, Fisher attended the public schools of Kent County, Delaware, Mount St. Mary's College (now Mount St. Mary's University) in Emmitsburg, Maryland, then graduated from Dickinson College in Carlisle, Pennsylvania in July 1838. He read law with John M. Clayton, then the Chief Justice of the Delaware Supreme Court, and was admitted to the bar in 1841. He entered private practice in Dover, Delaware starting in 1841. He was clerk for the Delaware Senate in 1843. He was a member of the Delaware House of Representatives in 1844. He was appointed Secretary of State of Delaware by Governor of Delaware Joseph Maull, serving from 1846 to 1847. He was Aide-de-camp to Major General Nathaniel Young, Commander of the Delaware Militia starting in 1846. He was confidential clerk to United States Secretary of State John M. Clayton from 1849 to 1850. Fisher assisted in negotiating the Clayton–Bulwer Treaty with Great Britain. He was a Commissioner to settle claims of United States Citizens against Brazil from 1850 to 1852. He was private secretary for President Millard Fillmore starting in 1852. He was Attorney General of Delaware from 1855 to 1860.

Congressional service

Fisher was elected as a Unionist from Delaware's at-large congressional district to the United States House of Representatives of the 37th United States Congress, serving from March 4, 1861, to March 3, 1863. He was an unsuccessful candidate for reelection in 1862 to the 38th United States Congress. Following his departure from Congress, he was a Colonel in the First Delaware Cavalry in 1863.

Compensated emancipation proposal

In Congress, Fisher supported Abraham Lincoln's compensated emancipation proposal, but failed to find someone in the Delaware General Assembly willing to introduce it.

Federal judicial service

Fisher was nominated by President Abraham Lincoln on March 10, 1863, to the Supreme Court of the District of Columbia (now the United States District Court for the District of Columbia), to a new Associate Justice seat authorized by 12 Stat. 762. He was confirmed by the United States Senate on March 11, 1863, and received his commission the same day. His service terminated on May 1, 1870, due to his resignation.

Notable case

In 1867, Fisher presided over the trial of John Surratt, one of the Lincoln assassination conspirators.

Later career

Following his resignation from the federal bench, Fisher served as United States Attorney for the District of Columbia from 1870 to 1875. After leaving this position (according to his biography by Charles B. Lore), he had "no intention of again entering public life." However, he was appointed by President Benjamin Harrison on May 31, 1889, to serve as first auditor for the United States Department of the Treasury until March 23, 1893.

Later years and death

Fisher "then returned to the home of his childhood, lived quietly in his extensive library, and devoted the last years of his life to reading and literary pursuits." He died after a short illness on February 10, 1899, in Washington, D.C. He was interred in Oak Hill Cemetery in Washington, D.C. and re-interred in the Methodist Cemetery in Dover.

Election results

References

Sources

 
 

 
 
 

1817 births
1899 deaths
People from Milford, Delaware
Dickinson College alumni
Delaware lawyers
Delaware Attorneys General
Secretaries of State of Delaware
Members of the Delaware House of Representatives
Members of the United States House of Representatives from Delaware
Judges of the United States District Court for the District of Columbia
United States federal judges appointed by Abraham Lincoln
19th-century American judges
People of Delaware in the American Civil War
Burials at Oak Hill Cemetery (Washington, D.C.) 
Burials in Dover, Delaware
19th-century American politicians
United States federal judges admitted to the practice of law by reading law
United States Attorneys for the District of Columbia
Unionist Party members of the United States House of Representatives
Unionist Party (United States) politicians